The WNB Tower is a 12-story, 115 foot highrise building in downtown Midland, Texas.  The second and third levels of the building are parking garages.  The building is located at 508 W. Wall St.  It houses various companies such as oil & gas and attorney's offices.  Its main tenant in the building is Western National Bank.  The bank has an operational branch in the lobby and has its main operations on the tenth floor.  The eleventh floor houses the bank's lending operations and also houses WNB Private Client Services.  The building also has a small cafe on the ground level called "Matteo's Internet Cafe"  .

Skyscraper office buildings in Midland, Texas
Office buildings completed in 1982
1982 establishments in Texas